The Abbot's Kitchen in Oxford, England, is an early chemistry laboratory based on the Abbot's Kitchen at Glastonbury Abbey, a mediaeval 14th-century octagonal building that served as the kitchen at the abbey.

History
Chemistry was first recognized as a separate discipline at Oxford University with the construction of this laboratory, attached to the Oxford University Museum of Natural History, and opening in 1860. The laboratory is a stone-built structure to the right of the museum, built in the Victorian Gothic style. The building was one of the first ever purpose-built chemical laboratories anywhere and was extended in 1878. A further major extension adding three wings was completed in 1957. It is still a part of the Department of Chemistry. The ground floor is used as a training room by the Radcliffe Science Library.

In December 2018 it was announced that the building would be used as part of a new graduate college of the University, Reuben College, opening in 2021.

Gallery

See also
 Abbot's Kitchen, Glastonbury, on which the laboratory building was based
 Balliol-Trinity Laboratories, another early Oxford chemistry laboratory
 Department of Chemistry, University of Oxford
 List of octagonal buildings and structures

References

External links

 

1860 establishments in England
Buildings and structures completed in 1860
Buildings and structures of the University of Oxford
University and college laboratories in the United Kingdom
Chemistry laboratories
Octagonal buildings in the United Kingdom
Stone buildings
Reuben College, Oxford